Oroanna was a town of ancient Ionia. Its name doesn't appear among ancient authors, but is inferred from epigraphic and other evidence. 

Its site is located north of ancient Colophon, Asiatic Turkey.

References

Populated places in ancient Ionia
Former populated places in Turkey